The Night of the Following Day is a 1969 American Technicolor crime film directed by Hubert Cornfield starring Marlon Brando, Richard Boone, Rita Moreno and Pamela Franklin. Filmed in France, around Le Touquet it tells the story of a kidnapped heiress being held hostage in a remote beachhouse on the coast of France.

Plot
The film starts with a young woman (Franklin) on an airplane and a stewardess, Vi (Moreno) bending over her. As she leaves, we see a chauffeur, Bud (Brando), saying something to her which we do not hear. He puts her in the back of a Rolls-Royce and drives off. They stop at a junction and Leer (Boone) gets in. The girl realises she has been kidnapped.

Bud starts to have second thoughts. He tries to protect the girl when Leer gets out of control. Bud also has to deal with a lack of courage in himself, with the head of the operation and Vi, who uses drugs and cannot be trusted.

Then things start to unravel. Leer kills all his partners in crime on their return with the ransom, the car catching fire. Bud, perhaps anticipating this betrayal, gets out early. Hiding on the beach, he is able to exact revenge and shoots Leer as he signals to a ship waiting to take him from the country.

All is revealed to be a dream during the girl's flight, sparked by Vi, the air hostess. But then the girl meets Bud in the airport just as in the dream...

Cast

 Marlon Brando as Bud, the Chauffeur
 Richard Boone as Leer
 Rita Moreno as Vi, the Blonde Air Stewardess
 Pamela Franklin as Girl
 Jess Hahn as Friendly 
 Gerard Buhr as Fisherman-Cop
 Jacques Marin as Bartender
 Huques Wanner as Father
 Al Lettieri as Pilot (as Al Lettier)

References

External links
 
 
 
 

1968 films
1960s crime thriller films
American crime thriller films
Films about kidnapping
Films based on American novels
Films directed by Hubert Cornfield
Films scored by Stanley Myers
Films set in France
Films shot in France
Universal Pictures films
1960s English-language films
1960s American films